Cannella, Canella and Canela are surnames ultimately originating from the Latin  'small cane'. Notable people with these surnames include:

Canela 
 Ailton Canela (1994–2016), Brazilian footballer
 Andoni Canela (born 1969), Spanish photographer
 Jason Canela (born 1992), American actor
 Jencarlos Canela (born 1988), American singer, songwriter and actor
 Mercè Canela (born 1956), Catalan writer and translator
 Miguel Canela Lázaro (1894–1977), Dominican medical scientist
 Teresa Canela Giménez (born 1959), Spanish chess player

Canella 
 Carlo Canella (1800–1879), Italian painter
 Francesco Canella (born 1939), Italian footballer
 Giulio Canella (early 20th century), Italian scholar whose disappearance was part of the Bruneri-Canella case
 Giuseppe Canella (1788–1847), Italian painter
 Grimaldo Canella (died  1184), Consul of Genoa
 Otto Canella (died 1143), Consul of Genoa
 Roberto Canella (born 1988), Spanish footballer
 Valeria Canella (born 1982), Italian long jumper

Cannella 
 Anthony Cannella (born 1969), American politician
 Frank Cannella (born 1957), American businessman and philanthropist
 John Matthew Cannella (1908-1996), United States federal judge
 Sal Cannella (born 1943), American politician
 Shannon Cannella (born 1969), American Professor and Author

Italian-language surnames
Spanish-language surnames